Charlotte is a city in Clinton County, Iowa, United States. The population was 389 at the 2020 census.

History
Charlotte was platted in 1871; a post office already been established there in 1853. The town was named for the first postmaster's wife, Charlotte Gilmore.

Geography
Charlotte's longitude and latitude coordinates in decimal form are 41.961163, -90.469704.

Demographics

2010 census
As of the census of 2010, there were 394 people, 156 households, and 105 families living in the city. The racial makeup of the city was 87.8% White, 0.8% African American, 2.0% Asian, and 9.4% from other races. Hispanic or Latino of any race were 11.7% of the population.

There were 156 households, of which 36.5% had children under the age of 18 living with them, 50.6% were married couples living together, 11.5% had a female householder with no husband present, 5.1% had a male householder with no wife present, and 32.7% were non-families. 31.4% of all households were made up of individuals, and 17.3% had someone living alone who was 65 years of age or older. The average household size was 2.53 and the average family size was 3.10.

The median age in the city was 33.3 years. 29.2% of residents were under the age of 18; 7.5% were between the ages of 18 and 24; 25.6% were from 25 to 44; 23.3% were from 45 to 64; and 14.2% were 65 years of age or older. The gender makeup of the city was 48.2% male and 51.8% female.

2000 census

As of the census of 2000, there were 421 people, 163 households, and 113 families living in the city. The racial makeup of the city was 97.86% White, 0.24% African American, 0.48% Asian, and 1.43% from two or more races. Hispanic or Latino of any race were 2.38% of the population.

There were 163 households, out of which 38.7% had children under the age of 18 living with them, 55.2% were married couples living together, 12.3% had a female householder with no husband present, and 30.1% were non-families. 25.2% of all households were made up of individuals, and 13.5% had someone living alone who was 65 years of age or older. The average household size was 2.58 and the average family size was 3.14.

In the city, the population was spread out, with 29.9% under the age of 18, 9.7% from 18 to 24, 29.5% from 25 to 44, 16.6% from 45 to 64, and 14.3% who were 65 years of age or older. The median age was 34 years. For every 100 females, there were 87.9 males. For every 100 females age 18 and over, there were 87.9 males.

The median income for a household in the city was $37,500, and the median income for a family was $43,750. Males had a median income of $27,656 versus $17,857 for females. The per capita income for the city was $15,312. About 6.1% of families and 8.8% of the population were below the poverty line, including 12.6% of those under age 18 and 3.2% of those age 65 or over.

Infrastructure
Charlotte is located on Iowa Highway 136 at the end of County Road Z24.

Education
The Northeast Community School District operates public schools serving the community.

References

External links

 
Charlotte, IA Portal style website, Government, Businesses, and more

Cities in Iowa
Cities in Clinton County, Iowa
1871 establishments in Iowa
Populated places established in 1871